The 1920 New South Wales state election was held on 20 March 1920. The 24th parliament of New South Wales was dissolved on 18 February 1920 by the Governor, Sir Walter Edward Davidson, on the advice of the Premier William Holman.
The election was for all of the 90 seats in the 25th New South Wales Legislative Assembly, and it was the first to be conducted with multi-member electorates, using the Hare-Clark single transferable vote system.

It was conducted using 24 districts, 15 having 3 members and nine having five members.

Key dates

Results

The assembly was evenly divided, with Labor having 43 seats and the support of Percy Brookfield and Arthur Gardiner (Independent Labor), while the Nationalists had 28 seats and the support of 15 seats of the Progressive Party and 2 independent Nationalists. The Speaker of the Legislative Assembly did not vote unless there was a tie which meant whichever side provided the speaker was unable to command a majority. Nationalist Daniel Levy controversially accepted re-election as speaker, giving Labor an effective majority.

{{Australian elections/Title row
| table style = float:right;clear:right;margin-left:1em;
| title        = 1920 New South Wales state election
| house        = Legislative Assembly
| series       = New South Wales state election
| back         = 1917
| forward      = 1922
| enrolled     = 1,154,437
| total_votes  = 648,709
| turnout %    = 56.19
| turnout chg  = −5.24
| informal     = 62,900
| informal %   = 9.70
| informal chg = +8.68
}}

|}

Changing seats

See also
 Candidates of the 1920 New South Wales state election
 Members of the New South Wales Legislative Assembly, 1920–1922

Notes

References

Elections in New South Wales
New South Wales State Election
1920s in New South Wales
New South Wales State Election